Summer of '78 is an album by singer-songwriter Barry Manilow, released in 1996. The album was a collection of cover versions of popular songs, mostly from the late 1970s, and was recorded in Nashville, Tennessee.

Track listing

Personnel
Barry Manilow - vocals, keyboards
 Tim Akers - keyboards
 Mike Brignardello - guitar, bass
 Eric Darken - percussion
 John Hammond - drums
 Tom Hemby - guitar, bass
 Dann Huff - electric guitar
 Bonnie Keen - backing vocals
 Paul Leim - drums
 Blair Masters - synthesizer
 Marty McCall - backing vocals
 Jerry McPherson - electric guitar
 Michael Mellett - backing vocals
 Michael Omartian - keyboards
 Chris Rodriguez - backing vocals
 Jimmie Lee Sloas - bass
 Biff Watson - acoustic guitar

References

1996 albums
Arista Records albums
Barry Manilow albums
albums produced by Michael Omartian